Dance With The Chorizo is an EP by Kid 606. It consists of remixes of songs from his album Shout At The Döner. The song "Another One Bites The Dubstep" features a sample from The Prodigy's "Breathe" throughout the track. Cover artwork by Sandra Boeckmann.

Track listing
 "Samhain Atlanta" – 4:16 
 "Another One Bites The Dubstep" – 4:56
 "Lowlife Highrolling" – 3:25 
 "Samhain California (C.L.A.W.S. Remix)" – 5:40
 "Under Everywhere (Cex Remix)" - 8:17
 "Hello Serotonin, My Old Friend (Michael Forshaw Remix)" - 3:28
 "Hello Serotonin, My Old Friend (Eats Tapes Remix)" - 6:52
 "Baltimorrow's Parties (dDamage Remix)" - 4:50
 "Gratuitous Baltimore Birthday Jam" - 5:56
 "You Still All Break My Heart" - 6:50

External links
 Dance With The Chorizo at Discogs
 Dance With The Chorizo at Tigerbeat6

2009 EPs
Kid606 albums
Tigerbeat6 EPs